Eiken Elam Saimon is a man who was convicted by Missouri of three counts of first-degree murder for opening fire on a church congregation in Neosho, Missouri in 2007.

Saimon is a native of Pohnpei and a national of the Federated States of Micronesia; he was living in Neosho at the time of the shootings. Witnesses reported that on 12 August 2007, Saimon entered the First Congregational Church in Neosho during Sunday services. There were over 50 people attending the services, most of them from Neosho's Micronesian community. Police said that Saimon carried two small-caliber handguns and a 9-millimeter semi-automatic pistol. After asking the children and some members of his own family to leave the room, Saimon began shooting at the other people in the church. Three people were killed: the pastor of the church and two deacons. Police suspected that he was specifically targeting church leaders.

Saimon was arrested after approximately ten minutes of negotiations with the police. After his arrest, police announced that Saimon was also being charged with the sexual assault of a 14-year-old relative. The connection between the alleged sexual assault and the shooting incident was unclear.

A preliminary hearing was held on 18 September 2007, where Saimon pleaded not guilty to three counts of murder, four counts of assault, one count of felonious restraint, and one count of armed criminal action. In September 2008, Saimon's trial was scheduled to begin in July 2009. Before the start of the trial, Saimon reversed his plea and pleaded guilty on March 29, 2009 to three counts of first-degree murder and four counts of first-degree assault. He also pleaded guilty to charges of statutory rape and statutory sodomy for a sexual assault on a 14-year-old girl two days before the August 12, 2007, shootings. In a deal with prosecutors, he avoided the death penalty, but was sentenced to three consecutive life sentences without the possibility of parole, along with four 30-year sentences for the assaults and two seven-year sentences for the sex offenses. Saimon is imprisoned in Crossroads Correctional Center.

References

Associated Press, "Murder Charges Filed in Shooting of Three Leaders of a Missouri Church", The New York Times, 14 August 2007
"Church suspect charged with 3 murder counts: Police: Man targeted congregation leaders in shooting", MSNBC, 13 August 2007
Aurora Meyer, "Neosho shooting trial to begin in July", Missourinet, 22 September 2008
Government of the Federated States of Micronesia, "President Mori Responds to the Neosho Shooting Incident", press release, 24 August 2007
Associated Press, "Man Pleads Guilty in Missouri Church Shooting", MSNBC, 30 March 2009

Year of birth missing (living people)
Living people
2007 crimes in the United States
21st-century Oceanian people
People from Pohnpei State
Federated States of Micronesia people convicted of murder
Federated States of Micronesia people imprisoned abroad
People convicted of murder by Missouri
People from Neosho, Missouri
Federated States of Micronesia expatriates in the United States
Federated States of Micronesia–United States relations
Federated States of Micronesia prisoners sentenced to life imprisonment
Prisoners sentenced to life imprisonment by Missouri
2007 murders in the United States
Attacks on churches in North America